Chipman is an unincorporated community in Queens County, New Brunswick, Canada. It held village status prior to 2023.

The community of Chipman is located on the banks of the Salmon River at the head of the Grand Lake, the largest freshwater lake in the Maritime provinces. The village itself is located around 73.4 kilometres from the capital city of Fredericton.

History
Chipman is named after Ward Chipman Jr. (1787-1851), who served as Chief Justice of New Brunswick from 1834 to 1851.  The village of Chipman was founded in 1835, and was made up of portions of the older parishes of Brunswick and Canning. The first settler in what would become the Parish of Chipman was Alexander McClure of County Tyrone, who arrived in 1820 with his wife, Mary McLeod and their five daughters. Earlier settlements upriver at Gaspereau, and downriver at the Range, existed prior to 1820, consisting of local settlers and Maine businessmen who established the first sawmills on the Salmon and Gaspereau Rivers. Immigration to the Chipman area escalated rapidly in the 1820s through the 1850s, with the large majority of new arrivals hailing from the northern counties of Ireland, in particular: Donegal, Londonderry, and Tyrone. The rapidly growing lumbering and sawmill industries were the primary impetus for this growth, which continued through most of the 19th century. The Parish of Chipman quickly became prominent because of its large population in comparison with the surrounding parishes, aided by the lure of employment from the burgeoning lumber mills, the coming of the railways, the development of the coal mining industry, and later in the 1930s, the establishment of L.E. Shaw's brick and tile plant.

Despite its prosperity, economic growth in the late 19th and early 20th centuries was insufficient to provide employment for all the population at a time when families typically produced several children. As a consequence, Chipman experienced its own exodus of surplus labourforce, particularly young men who had gained valuable experience in lumbering and milling. Chipman-area natives became pioneering founders of the embryonic sawmill industries in Montana, Washington state and California, as well as leading businessmen in other ventures in the new western U.S. territories and states.

After flying the LGBTQ rainbow flag 24 June 2018 for a week, the village council of Chipman approved in October 2018 a "straight flag"—removed after one day because of local complaints that this was a "display of hate."   "Helen Kennedy, executive director of human rights group Egale Canada, said she wasn't familiar with the straight flag -- and Sunday's ceremony was the first time she had heard of it being raised in Canada."

On 1 January 2023, Chipman amalgamated with the village of Minto and all or part of five local service districts to form the new village of Grand Lake. The community's name remains in official use.

Demographics 

Notable people
Elizabeth Brewster, CM SOM (26 August 1922 – 26 December 2012) was a poet, author, and academic.

See also 
 List of communities in New Brunswick
 List of counties of New Brunswick

References

Further reading 
 Baird, Rev. Frank, M.A., D.D., 1946.  History of the Parish of Chipman. Sackville, NB: Tribune Press Ltd.
 Baird, Rev. Frank, M.A., D.D., 1941. Salmon River One Hundred Years Ago - An Address at the Centennial Celebration of the Chipman United Church.
 Chipman Historical Photo Committee, eds. 2002.  Chipman Then and Now: A Pictorial History of Chipman and Neighbouring Communities. Chipman: Mirror Printing.
 Copeland, Gary. 1992.  Men of Clay, The Chipman Story: A Historical Biography of the Chipman Brick Industry ( 1928–1990). St. Stephen, NB: Data I.
 Morell, Marjorie Taylor. 1981.  Of  Mines and Men. St. Stephen, NB: Print'N Press.
 Gillett, Heather Roselle. 2008. "What is a Brickmaker: An Occupational Folklife Study of the Brick Industry in Chipman, New Brunswick." MA Thesis (Folklore). St John's, Memorial University of Newfoundland.

Communities in Queens County, New Brunswick
Former villages in New Brunswick
Mining communities in New Brunswick